Quercus resinosa is a species of oak. It is native to central and western Mexico, from Nayarit south to Michoacán and east as far as San Luis Potosí. It is placed in Quercus section Quercus.

Description

References

resinosa
Endemic oaks of Mexico
Flora of the Sierra Madre Occidental
Plants described in 1854